Ricardo Morales (February 1, 1907  February 28, 2007) was a Cuban professional tennis player.

Career
Morales competed on the Caribbean Circuit during the 1920s and 1930s. He played his first tournament at the 1928 U.S. National Championships. In 1933 he won the first of three titles at the Cuban International Championships also known as the Havana International, the othe titles coming in 1936 and 1939.  

In addition he was a finalist at the Bahamas International Championships in 1936, a finalist at the Jamaican International Championships in 1937, and a finalist at the Cuban Indoor Championships in 1943. He played his last tournament at the Cuban International where he reached the final for the fourth time before retiring.

In team tennis he was part of the Cuba Davis Cup team, and took part in tournaments, including 1929 Davis Cup, 1932 International Lawn Tennis Challenge, and 1933 Davis Cup.

References

External links 
 
 Ricardo Morales at Legacy.com

1907 births
2007 deaths
University of Havana alumni
Cuban male tennis players
Central American and Caribbean Games medalists in tennis
Central American and Caribbean Games gold medalists for Cuba
Central American and Caribbean Games silver medalists for Cuba
Central American and Caribbean Games bronze medalists for Cuba
Cuban emigrants to the United States